The 14th Senate of Spain is the current meeting of the Senate of Spain, the upper house of the Spanish Cortes Generales, with the membership determined primarily by the results of the general election held on 10 November 2019. The Senate met for the first time on 3 December 2019. According to the Constitution of Spain the maximum legislative term of the senate is 4 years from the preceding election.

Election
The 14th Spanish general election under the 1978 Constitution was held on 10 November 2019. It saw the Spanish Socialist Workers' Party (PSOE) remaining the largest party in the Senate, but falling short of a majority.

History
The new senate met for the first time on 3 December 2019 and after two rounds of voting Pilar Llop (PSOE) was  elected as President of the Senate of Spain.

Other members of the Bureau of the Senate were also elected on 3 December 2019: Cristina Narbona (PSOE), First Vice-President; Pío García-Escudero (PP), Second Vice-President; Francisco Fajardo (PSOE), First Secretary; Imanol Landa (EAJ), Second Secretary; Rafael Hernando (PP), Third Secretary; and Cristina Ayala (PP), Fourth Secretary.

Deaths, resignations and regional legislature appointments
The 14th senate has seen the following deaths, resignations and regional legislature appointments:

Elected senators
 11 February 2020 – María García (PSOE) resigned after being appointed government delegate in Andalusia. She will be replaced by Abelardo Vico (PSOE).

Appointed senators
 19 December 2019 – Jacobo González-Robatto (Vox) appointed by the Parliament of Andalusia.

Members

See also
 14th Cortes Generales
 14th Congress of Deputies

Notes

References
 
 

2019 establishments in Spain
 
Senate of Spain
Senate of Spain